Duchess Maria Elisabeth Amalie Franziska in Bavaria (5 May 1784 – 1 June 1849) was a Duchess in Bavaria as a member of the Palatine Birkenfeld-Gelnhausen line of the House of Wittelsbach and through her marriage to Louis-Alexandre Berthier became Princess of Wagram and Princess of Neuchâtel.

Life
Maria Elisabeth was born in Landshut, Electorate of Bavaria, the only daughter and second child of Duke Wilhelm in Bavaria and his wife Countess Palatine Maria Anna of Zweibrücken-Birkenfeld, sister of the future king Maximilian I Joseph of Bavaria. She died in Paris, France, aged 65.

Marriage and issue
Maria Elisabeth married Louis-Alexandre Berthier (20 February 1753 – 1 June 1815), 1st Prince of Wagram, 1st Sovereign Prince of Neuchâtel and a Marshal of France, on 9 March 1808. They had one son and two daughters :
Napoléon Alexandre, 2nd Prince, 1st Duke (11 September 1810 – 10 February 1887) married on 29 June 1831 Zénaïde Françoise Clary (25 November 1812 – 27 April 1884) and had issue, extinct in male line in 1918
Caroline Joséphine (22 August 1812 – 1905) married on 9 October 1832 Alphonse Napoléon, Baron of Hautpoul (29 May 1806 – 25 April 1889)
Marie Anne Wilhelmine Alexandrine Elisabeth (19 February 1816 – 23 July 1878) married on 24 June 1834 Jules Lebrun, 3rd Duke of Plaisance (19 April 1811 – 15 January 1872)

Ancestry

References

External links

1784 births
1849 deaths
People from Landshut
House of Wittelsbach
German Roman Catholics
Duchesses in Bavaria
Princesses of Neuchâtel
Daughters of monarchs